Ferran Font (Born in Vic, Barcelona, November 12, 1996) is a Spanish economist and a hockey athlete. He obtained the second position in the European Championship U-17 in 2011 in Geneva, and won the Wilmott Quantitative Trading in 2014 in Chicago, United States.

Font is a professional roller hockey player who plays for Sporting CP.

Biography
Ferran Font was born in Vic, Spain.
His mother tongue is Catalán.

He started playing in C.P. Voltregà, where he did his first steps on skates. Some years later he changed teams to one of the greatest rivals C.P. Vic, where he was able to reach the senior team in #OK Liga.

References

1996 births
Living people
Spanish economists
Spanish roller hockey players
Sporting CP roller hockey players